Christine Ostermayer (born 15 December 1936 in Vienna, Austria) is an Austrian actress.

Selected filmography
 Derrick - Season 10, Episode 07: "Lohmanns innerer Frieden" (1983)

External links

ZBF Agency Munich 

Austrian television actresses
Actresses from Vienna
1936 births
Living people
20th-century Austrian actresses
21st-century Austrian actresses